The Ontario Line is an under-construction rapid transit line in Toronto, Ontario, Canada. Its northern terminus will be at Eglinton Avenue and Don Mills Road, at Science Centre station, where it will connect with Line 5 Eglinton. Its southern terminus will be at the existing Exhibition GO Station on the Lakeshore West line. The Ontario Line was announced by the Government of Ontario on April 10, 2019. Originally, the cost was estimated at $10.9billion with completion by 2027. A groundbreaking ceremony for the project took place on March 27, 2022. Upon opening, the plan is for the line to assume the "Line 3" moniker currently used by Line 3 Scarborough, which is expected to close in 2023.

Project history

Downtown Relief Line 

Plans for an east–west downtown subway line date back to the early 20th century, most of which ran along Queen Street. In the 1980s, plans first emerged for a "Downtown Relief Line" that would provide capacity relief to the Yonge segment of Line 1 and the Bloor–Yonge interchange station, and extend subway service coverage in the city's east end.

Efforts to increase capacity on Line 1 included longer, walk through trains, as well as the transition to automatic train control to increase the frequency of service. However, by 2012, the Toronto Transit Commission stated that a relief line will be required by the 2030s, given the overcrowding and high demand along the Yonge corridor.

Since the early 21st century, studies proposed a line that would run south from Line 2 Bloor–Danforth at a point east of the Don River before bending westward along Queen Street into Downtown Toronto. The Relief Line was included in the regional transportation plan The Big Move and was noted as one of Metrolinx's top 15 transit priorities.

In the mid-2010s, the City of Toronto developed plans for this line, known as the "Relief Line South", between Pape station on Line 2 Bloor–Danforth and Osgoode station on Line 1 Yonge–University. In August 2018, an alignment was approved by the Ontario Ministry of Environment, Conservation, and Parks. It was estimated that the Relief Line South would cost around $6.8billion and open in the late 2020s. In early 2019, the Ontario government announced its intention to take over subway construction in Toronto from the TTC.

Ontario Line 
In a surprise announcement in April 2019, the Ontario government presented the Ontario Line proposal, which at that time appeared to incorporate much of the routing and many of the station locations of the Relief Line. Unlike the city's design, the Ontario Line would be a "standalone" line, one that would use lighter rolling stock and shorter trainsets than the Toronto Transit Commission's existing subway lines. Members of Toronto City Council expressed their concerns that the new line would set back the delivery of rapid transit and potentially waste money the city had already spent on the Relief Line's design.

Metrolinx prepared the plan for the Ontario Line in just three months based on a proposal by transit consultant Michael Schabas. Metrolinx hired Schabas in December 2018 to lead a team to transform the Relief Line plans into the Ontario Line. Schabas supported using lighter metro vehicles such as those used in London's Docklands Light Railway, as such vehicles were deemed more suitable for steeper grades and elevated structures. A draft plan was ready by January 31, 2019. Doug Ford approved the plan after a February 26 presentation. Metrolinx kept the project a secret until the government chose to announce it on April 10.

As initially announced in April 2019, the route of the Ontario Line seemed to follow much of the route of the Relief Line, beginning at Exhibition Place, travelling northeast to King and Bathurst Streets, then northeast to Spadina Avenue and Queen Street. It then proceeded eastward through downtown along Queen Street before turning southeast in the area of Parliament Street south to Eastern Avenue. The line had one station on King Street and Sumach Street, then made an east–west crossing of the Lower Don River to a station at Broadview and Eastern Avenue. The line proceeded northeast to Pape Avenue and Danforth Avenue and continued north along Pape Avenue, making a north–south crossing of the Don River to the Thorncliffe Park neighbourhood. The line continued northeast along Don Mills Road to terminate at Don Mills Road and Eglinton Avenue.

The announcement that the line would extend to a new station at Ontario Place stirred controversy, as Premier Doug Ford had spoken of transforming Ontario Place, previously a family-oriented venue, into an adult-oriented casino complex. Some suspected that the plan to extend the line to Ontario Place was aimed at visiting gamblers, not Ontarians. Ford denied that the extension was related to any casino plans. The Globe and Mail reported that no previous plan had ever considered making Ontario Place a rapid transit destination and that the announcement surprised everyone, including mayor of Toronto John Tory.

In July 2019, the Toronto Star obtained and reported on confidential documents from Metrolinx. The documents showed that the proposed route would be markedly different from that of the Relief Line South and involve significant lengths of at-grade or elevated track. The Ontario Place station was eliminated, with an Exhibition station added near the Exhibition GO Station. The section between Queen/Sherbourne and Gerrard stations would come to the surface and mostly follow a railway right-of-way instead of being tunnelled. The Ontario Line would share less than half the planned route of the Relief Line between Osgoode and Pape stations.

In October 2019, Tory and Ford reached a tentative deal in which the city would endorse the line and the TTC's subway network would not be taken over by the provincial government. The deal was later approved by Toronto City Council in a 22 to 3 decision.

Procurement
The Ontario Line project is being delivered through various public–private partnerships (P3), progressive design–build and traditional procurement contracts, which are all being staged accordingly for their successful delivery. The contracts are:

Rolling stock, systems, operations and maintenance 
On June 2, 2020, Infrastructure Ontario (IO) and Metrolinx issued a request for qualification (RFQ) for rolling stock, systems, operations and maintenance (RSSOM), marking the first phase of procurement for the Ontario Line. On November 17, 2022, Metrolinx and Infrastructure Ontario awarded the contract to Connect 6ix, a consortium including Hitachi Rail, Webuild, Transdev, IBI Group, among others, with a projected in-service date of 2031.

This contract will include design, construction, operation and ongoing maintenance of:

 Rolling stock, to be built by consortium member Hitachi Rail
 Maintenance and storage facility for the rolling stock, and an operations and control facility
 Train operations, including using an automated automated unattended train operation system
 Systems including track, signalling systems, CCTV, passenger information

Southern civil, stations and tunnel 
On June 2, 2020, Infrastructure Ontario (IO) and Metrolinx issued an RFQ for the southern portion, marking the first phase of procurement for the Ontario Line. On November 9, 2022, Metrolinx and Infrastructure Ontario awarded the contract to Ontario Transit Group, a consortium including Ferrovial, VINCI, AECOM, GHD, among others, with a projected completion date of 2030.

This contract will include design and construction of:

 A  tunnel through downtown Toronto from Exhibition to Don Yard portal (west of Don River)
 Seven stations including four new standalone underground stations (King-Bathurst, Queen-Spadina, Moss Park, Corktown), two underground interchange stations (Queen-Yonge and Osgoode) and one above-ground station (Exhibition)
 Other civil engineering work (including emergency exits) prior to mechanical and electrical systems installation by the RSSOM contract

North Pape tunnel and underground stations 
On November 17, 2022, Metrolinx and Infrastructure Ontario issued an RFQ for the northern portion between Gerrard station and the Don Valley Bridge.

This contract will include construction of: 

  of tunnel underneath Pape Avenue
 Two underground stations – one standalone (Cosburn) and one interchange (Pape)
 Other civil engineering work (including emergency exits) prior to mechanical and electrical systems installation by the RSSOM contract

Elevated guideway and stations 
On November 17, 2022, Metrolinx and Infrastructure Ontario issued an RFQ for the northern portion between the Don Valley Bridge and Ontario Science Centre.

This contract will include construction of:

  of elevated guideway
 Five elevated stations (Riverside-Leslieville, Gerrard, Thorncliffe Park, Flemingdon Park, Science Centre), including connections to Line 5 Eglinton at Science Centre
 Other civil engineering work (including emergency exits) prior to mechanical and electrical systems installation by the RSSOM contract

Revision of estimates
In July 2019, the estimated completion date was 2027. By December 2020, the completion date had been revised to 2030. Metrolinx said that the original completion date was based on market conditions that since 2019 had changed dramatically. By November 2022, the completion date was being reported as 2031.

In 2019, the estimated cost of the line was to be about $10.9 billion. By November 2022, that estimate had nearly doubled to $17 to $19 billion. The provincial government claimed that the higher estimate was due to inflation and supply issues.

Construction
A ground-breaking ceremony attended by Ford, Tory, and other politicians and officials was held on March 27, 2022 at Exhibition Place, despite no major contracts having been awarded at that point. By the end of August 2022, buildings at the site of the future Corktown station had been demolished to allow for construction to start in 2023. In the meantime, archeologists were allowed on site to document any historical findings. 

Following the awarding of major contracts in November 2022, major design and construction work of the rolling stock, systems, operations and maintenance (RSSOM) and southern civil, stations and tunnel contracts were anticipated to commence in 2023.

Concerns
After a draft of the Ontario Line's business case was disclosed in July 2019, a number of concerns were raised by transit experts:
 Doubts were expressed that the line could be completed within budget and by 2027. Metrolinx plans to start the procurement process in 2020 to allow bidding companies to comment on the feasibility of the 2027 completion date. The estimated completion had been revised to 2030 by December 2020.
 It may be challenging to fit the Ontario Line along GO Transit's Lakeshore East corridor. The Ontario Line would need to be added to three existing overpasses. If the Ontario Line requires widening of the Lakeshore East embankment, property acquisitions may be required including nearby houses, businesses and community facilities. In September 2020, Metrolinx said the platform area of the former Grand Trunk Railway's Riverdale railway station gave the rail corridor extra width at Queen Street; thus, the Ontario Line would not impact the adjacent Jimmie Simpson Community Centre.
 Flood mitigation projects and reconstruction of the Gardiner Expressway at Lower Don River may impede Ontario Line construction.
 There are doubts that passengers can alight and board smaller Ontario Line trains quickly enough to achieve the projected 90-second train frequency. Metrolinx insists the frequency can be met by reducing station dwell times.
 There is a concern that winter conditions may adversely affect train operations on an elevated track like Line 3 Scarborough, which also uses light metro technology.
 The elevated structures may have a greater environmental impact with respect to noise, vibration and visual presence than with an underground right-of-way. Metrolinx proposes using mitigation strategies involving "systems, maintenance and track design" to reduce noise and vibration, and new community spaces and parks "to offset (the) visual impact and footprint of the elevated structure". Another design decision Metrolinx must make is whether the elevated structure along Don Mills Road would be above or beside the road. In September 2020, Metrolinx said it would build noise walls along the rail corridor between Gerrard and East Harbour stations.
 Some of the savings for surface construction may be partially offset by the cost of building surface-to-tunnel transitions at Cherry Street and at Gerrard Street.
 Operating costs for the above-ground sections may be higher due to exposure to the elements.
 Operating the Ontario Line along an elevated Lakeshore East embankment might require slower speeds in order to navigate grades and curves.

Description

Route

The following route description is based on a revised plan issued by Metrolinx in September and October 2020, plus a revision published in April 2021.

The northeastern terminus of the Ontario Line would be Science Centre station at Don Mills Road and Eglinton Avenue. This station would be a transfer point for Line 5 Eglinton and TTC buses. The Ontario Line platform would be on an elevated structure above Science Centre station's bus terminal, located north of Eglinton Avenue on the east side of Don Mills Road.

Continuing south on an elevated structure, the line would cross Eglinton Avenue and then cross to the west side of Don Mills Road, passing through Flemingdon Park station located on a northwest corner opposite Gateway Boulevard. Immediately south of this station, the line would turn west along the Hydro One right-of-way, and cross the Don Valley on a new bridge. Continuing west on the other side of the valley, the line would pass the Ontario Line maintenance and storage facility. The line would jog south to Overlea Boulevard and then jog west on the north side of that street on an elevated structure. The line would pass through Thorncliffe Park station, which would be over the western portion of Thorncliffe Park Boulevard. Continuing west on an elevated structure, the line would curve south over Millwood Road across the Don Valley on a new bridge roughly parallel and west of Leaside Bridge. On the south side of the valley crossing, the line would enter a tunnel under Minton Place.

From Minton Place, the line would continue south under Pape Avenue, passing through Cosburn and Pape stations. The tunnel, mainly under Pape Avenue, would bow slightly to the west at Cosburn station, and slightly to the east at Pape station to avoid digging up the street to construct the station structures. At Pape station, the Ontario Line would connect with Line 2 Bloor–Danforth.

South from Pape station, the line would travel roughly under Pape Avenue, emerging to the surface just north of Gerrard Street. The line would then enter Gerrard station on an elevated structure over the intersection of Gerrard Street and Carlaw Avenue. South of Gerrard station, the Ontario Line would run along the northwest side of GO Transit's Lakeshore East rail corridor located on an embankment. (The rail corridor has three tracks with provision for a fourth. With the construction of the Ontario Line, the corridor would eventually have six tracks.) The route would continue along the railway right-of-way, passing Riverside–Leslieville station at Queen Street East and continuing to East Harbour station, east of the Don River, on the south side of Eastern Avenue, where a new GO train station would be built on the surface. The Ontario Line would cross the Don River on a new bridge located on the north side of the existing rail bridge. After crossing the river, the line would pass the GO Transit Don Yard before descending into a tunnel just east of Cherry Street.

The route would turn north under the east side of Berkeley Street through Corktown station at King Street. Between King and Queen Streets, the line would make a broad north-to-west curve to run west under Queen Street through Moss Park station (between Shuter and Sherbourne streets), Queen station (at Yonge Street) and Osgoode station (at University Avenue). The line would continue westward to a Queen–Spadina station, then diagonally southwest via a King–Bathurst station to Strachan Avenue. The line would turn westward again, coming to the surface just west of Strachan Avenue on the north side of the railway corridor along Exhibition Place, before arriving at Exhibition station, its southwestern terminus.

Maintenance and storage facility

The Ontario Line maintenance and storage facility (OLMSF) will occupy a  site north of Overlea Boulevard, between Beth Nealson Drive and the CP Rail North Toronto Corridor. It will be located near the future Thorncliffe Park station. The facility would store 200 trains and have a maximum capacity of 250.

Construction of the MSF would require the demolition of an Islamic centre and a shopping plaza that includes local businesses such as the popular Iqbal Halal Foods, serving the primarily Muslim population of Thorncliffe Park. In December 2021, Metrolinx made a $49.5million agreement with the Islamic Society of Toronto to move to a larger facility at 20 Overlea Boulevard. Metrolinx would help relocate businesses within Thorncliffe Park. However, Save TPARK, a neighbourhood group, opposed the proposed location of the MSF as an unwelcome encroachment on the neighbourhood; it wanted Metrolinx to choose another location and offer the community more affordable housing.

Miscellaneous
In 2019, Metrolinx was considering a means to link Exhibition station to Ontario Place to the south. Options to provide the link included a people mover or cable cars.

The Government of Ontario plans to use smaller train sets and a smaller gauge for the Ontario Line than those used on the Toronto subway system. The City of Toronto's Relief Line proposal was expected to use existing heavy-rail rolling stock that is also used on Lines 1, 2, and 4. By using driverless trains with automatic train control (ATC), Metrolinx expects the line to be as frequent as the existing heavy rail lines despite using smaller, lighter trains. In conjunction with ATC, stations will have platform-edge doors for safety, also allowing riders to exit and enter trains more quickly. The government also claims the alternate technology will reduce construction time and cost, as single tunnels rather than dual tunnels could be utilized.

Most of the proposed stations on the Ontario Line will facilitate transfers between other forms of public transport, and the majority will provide transfers to other rail-based transportation (GO Transit, TTC subway and streetcar).

According to Metrolinx, the new line will do more than provide relief to overcrowding on Toronto's existing subway system: it will provide new connections to the communities of Flemingdon Park and Thorncliffe Park.

As Line 3 Scarborough is scheduled to be decommissioned in 2023, well before the opening of the Ontario Line, it is expected the Ontario Line will inherit Line 3's number and line colour of blue on maps and wayfinding.

Stations
The line will have 15 stations, with four connecting to other Toronto subway and light rail lines and two stations connecting to GO Transit rail services. Other stations have connections to Toronto Transit Commission streetcar and bus services. Station names and other details are subject to change.

Science Centre
The Ontario Line will serve Science Centre station at Eglinton Avenue, providing a connection to Line 5 Eglinton. The elevated Ontario Line station will be along Don Mills Road at the northeast corner of its intersection with Eglinton Avenue. Passengers will be able to access rail services from either the station's southwest or northeast entrance as well as from the adjacent bus terminal. The station will have three levels, with the Line 5 platforms below street level, the bus terminal at street level and the Ontario Line platforms above street level. Escalators, elevators and interior corridors will be available to facilitate transfers. It will also have side platforms, an unusual setup for rapid transit terminal stations in Toronto, which almost always feature centre platforms.

There will be tail tracks at the north end of the Ontario Line platforms extending north past Wynford Drive. These will be used to store trains and to provide for future northward expansion.

Flemingdon Park
Flemingdon Park station will be located on the west side of Don Mills Road at the north side of its intersection with Gateway Boulevard. It will be constructed at the site of a parking lot. , Metrolinx had not indicated the location of entrances and exits for this station. However, this station will be closer to the Ontario Science Centre's main entrance than Science Centre station.

Thorncliffe Park
Thorncliffe Park station will be located on the north side of Overlea Boulevard over Thorncliffe Park Drive. (Overlea Boulevard and Thorncliffe Park Drive intersect at two places within Thorncliffe Park. The station is at the western of the two intersections.) , Metrolinx has not indicated the location of entrances and exits for this station.

Cosburn
Cosburn station will be located at Cosburn Avenue and have a centre platform. It will be located under the west side of Pape Avenue so as to avoid digging up Pape Avenue itself during construction. , Metrolinx had not indicated the location of entrances and exits for this station.

Pape
The Ontario Line will serve the existing Pape station, providing a connection to Line 2 Bloor–Danforth at Danforth Avenue. Running slightly east of Pape Avenue, the Ontario Line will have a centre platform under Line 2 at the station. Metrolinx expects the Ontario Line connection at Pape station will reduce rush-hour congestion at Bloor–Yonge station by 22 percent. There are plans for an additional station entry directly from Danforth Avenue.

Gerrard
Gerrard will be located diagonally over the intersection of Gerrard Street East and Carlaw Avenue west of the Gerrard Square shopping mall. A retail strip mall with a No Frills supermarket will be demolished to make way for the station structure.

The station structure will be separate from the parallel railway bridge and embankment. The Ontario Line station will have centre platforms and two entrances. One entrance will be on the east side of Carlaw Avenue north of Gerrard Street. A second entrance will be on the south side of Gerrard Street adjacent to Gerrard Carlaw Parkette.

Riverside–Leslieville
Originally named Leslieville, Riverside–Leslieville will be located on the railway bridge over Queen Street East on the boundary between the Riverside (west side) and Leslieville (east side) neighbourhoods. The elevated Ontario Line station will have a centre platform and two entrances. One entrance will be on the north side of Queen Street under the bridge. A second entrance will be on the south side of Queen Street at the west side of the railway embankment. The GO Transit rail corridor will be on the east side of the Ontario Line tracks, but there will be no GO Transit railway station here. Metrolinx plans to rebuild the bridge over Queen Street in order to have it rise  over street level instead of the current .

East Harbour
East Harbour station will be an intermodal station with GO Transit trains and will be located between Eastern Avenue and the Don River along GO Transit's Lakeshore East / Stouffville rail corridor. It is also a proposed station for SmartTrack service. There is also a future proposal to extend streetcar service south along Broadview Avenue into the Port Lands in the vicinity of East Harbour station. The station will service a future office development.

East Harbour station will be built along the existing railway embankment. The station would have six tracks passing through it, two tracks for the Ontario Line on the northwest side of the railway embankment plus four tracks for GO trains on its southeast side. At East Harbour, there would be three platforms each serving a pair of tracks: one platform for Ontario Line trains, one for westbound GO trains and another for eastbound GO trains.

Corktown
Corktown station will be located at the southeast corner of King and Berkeley Streets straddling the Corktown neighbourhood and the Old Town. There will be an emergency exit on the north side of Front Street, just east of Berkeley Street. The tunnel will be under the land on the east side of Berkeley Street. The two city blocks bounded by Berkeley, King and Parliament Streets, and north of Parliament Square Park will be razed for tunnel launch shafts. (Construction will not affect the park itself.) The southern city block is the site of the First Parliament, and Metrolinx will allow archeologists to examine the site for artifacts before it is destroyed by construction. Once the site is prepared, a tunnel-boring machine will launch north and west from the site while another launches south and east towards the Don Yard.

Moss Park
Moss Park station will be located at the northwest corner of Queen and Sherbourne Streets next to the Moss Park Arena. At this point, the line will be under the southern edge of Moss Park (where the Moss Park Armoury is located), rather than under Queen Street. Only one entrance is planned, and plans for an emergency exit are not yet known.

In February 2023, Metrolinx cut down 61 trees to prepare the station site for construction. The trees were about 70 years old.

Queen
The line will serve the existing Queen station, providing a connection to Line 1 Yonge–University at Yonge Street. Running under Queen Street, it will cross under Line 1 at the station; the Lower Queen ghost station (a remnant of the never-completed Queen subway line) will be used for transferring between the two lines. Queen station already has seven entrances, including some in the Toronto Eaton Centre and at the Hudson's Bay Queen Street complex, and no additional entrances are planned.

Because of the urban density near Queen station, in August 2021, Metrolinx proposed closing Queen Street to road traffic between Victoria and Bay Streets and to streetcar traffic between Church and York Streets for 4.5 years for station construction. Road access would still be available to access parking facilities and truck delivery areas. Pedestrian access would also be provided. Metrolinx would construct new eastbound streetcar tracks along York and Adelaide Streets. During the Queen Street closure, westbound 501 Queen streetcars would divert via Church, Richmond and York Streets while eastbound streetcars would divert via York, Adelaide and Church Streets. The diversions would use what would normally be non-revenue streetcar tracks. However, this plan may need to be delayed because of the discovery of utility conflicts in late 2022; the revised plan would be bus substitution of the 501 Queen streetcar for up to 20 months, starting in May 2023.

Osgoode
The line will serve the existing Osgoode station, providing a connection to Line 1 Yonge–University. At University Avenue, the Ontario Line will run under Queen Street and cross under Line 1 at the station. The station will have two additional entrances. One entrance will be at the northeast corner of Queen Street and University Avenue. This will be in a corner of the gardens on the Osgoode Hall grounds. A second new entrance will be at the southwest corner of Queen and Simcoe Streets, one block west of University Avenue, where a bank building stands. The façade of the bank building will be dismantled and preserved for use on the new station entrance building.

In May 2022, Mayor John Tory and the Law Society of Ontario (co-owner of Osgoode Hall along with the Province of Ontario) objected to placing an entrance on a corner of the Osgoode Hall grounds as this would require the removal of a section of lawn, some urban tree cover and a section of a cast-iron fence. The city preferred that space be taken from the northbound lanes on University Avenue, but Metrolinx said building a shaft there would conflict with Line 1 running below. A consultant's report, dated February 1, 2023, and commissioned by the City of Toronto, concluded that the corner of the Osgoode Hall grounds was the best site for a headhouse based on various criteria but that the Campbell House grounds was a potentially feasible alternative site. On February 4, Metrolinx began work to remove eleven trees on the Osgoode Hall site but had to pause work due to court injunctions, one filed by the Law Society of Ontario and later another by the Haudenosaunee Development Institute, an Indigenous organization. On February 21, 2023, the Ontario Divisional Court dismissed the last injunction, allowing Metrolinx to proceed with removing the trees the next day. The affected trees were planted during World War II.

Queen–Spadina
Queen–Spadina station will be located directly under Queen Street West at its intersection with Spadina Avenue. Station entrances will be located at the southwest and northeast corners of the intersection. Ontario Line riders will be able to transfer to a 501 Queen or 510 Spadina streetcar at surface stops without having to fully cross a street. The station building design will feature heritage attributes by retaining the façade of buildings to be demolished for station construction.

King–Bathurst
King–Bathurst station will be located at the intersection of King Street West and Bathurst Street. The line will pass diagonally under the southeast corner of the intersection. Station entrances will be located at the northeast and southeast corners of the intersection. Connections to the 504 King and 511 Bathurst streetcars will be available on the surface. The station building design will feature heritage attributes by retaining the façade of buildings to be demolished for station construction.

Exhibition
Exhibition station will be located on the north side of Exhibition GO station along GO Transit's Lakeshore West rail corridor. There will be a shared concourse between the Ontario Line and GO Transit train services. A Metrolinx goal is to reduce congestion at Union Station by 14 percent by encouraging passengers to use the Ontario Line. Riders can also transfer to the 509 and 511 streetcars at Exhibition Loop.

The portal to the tunnelled portion of the line will be just east of the station platforms. Tail tracks will extend west of the platforms to Dufferin Street for storing and turning back trains and a possible future extension. At Exhibition station, the Ontario Line will have separate arrival and departure platforms with the turnback switches being west of the platforms. There will be a substation at 153 Dufferin Street, opposite Dufferin Gate Loop. A new station entrance will be built at 1 Atlantic Avenue.

Possible expansion plans 
The Ontario Ministry of Transportation (MTO) released the Connecting the GGH: A Transportation Plan for the Greater Golden Horseshoe to provide a 30-year vision for enhanced mobility within and across the Greater Golden Horseshoe (GGH), including future expansion plans for the Ontario Line. The MTO is planning a conceptual cross-regional rapid transit corridor that includes a "transit loop that connects the Ontario Line to new major transit hubs where regional services connect, including Pearson International Airport in Mississauga and Richmond Hill Centre, and to other subway and GO Rail lines". Titled the "Ontario Line Loop Connection", this conceptual corridor would be anchored around Pearson International Airport, downtown Toronto and Richmond Hill Centre, with an alignment from Pearson International Airport southeast to Kipling Station, then east to Exhibition GO Station (the western terminus of the original Ontario Line plans as announced by the Ontario government in April 2019), then operating on the planned Ontario Line alignment to the Ontario Science Centre (the eastern terminus of the original Ontario Line plans), then north to Richmond Hill Centre and west to Pearson International Airport along an undetermined route, to be implemented by 2051.  the proposal was not funded.

Notes

References

External links
 Metrolinx Ontario Line project site
 

Proposed Toronto rapid transit projects
2030s in rail transport